Belmont Literary and Historical Society Free Library, also known as Belmont Free Library, is a historic library building located at Belmont in Allegany County, New York.  It was built between 1893 and 1904, and is an example of late 19th century vernacular public architecture.  It is a two-story, triangular brick structure that features a three-story clock tower.

It was listed on the National Register of Historic Places in 2003.

References

External links
Belmont Literary Historical Society Free Library

Library buildings completed in 1904
Libraries on the National Register of Historic Places in New York (state)
Buildings and structures in Allegany County, New York
National Register of Historic Places in Allegany County, New York